Skøelva or Skøelv is the second largest village in Sørreisa Municipality in Troms og Finnmark county, Norway. The village is located along the mouth of the river Skøelva. Skøelv Chapel is located in the village.

References

Sørreisa
Villages in Troms